Henry Kisaja Magumba Kyemba (simply known as Henry Kyemba likely born 1937-1939) is a Ugandan retired political figure who held several high positions and finally became Minister of Health during Uganda's rule by Idi Amin. He served in that post from February 1974 until May 1977, when he fled into exile. He is also the author of State of Blood, a 1977 book he wrote after his flight from Uganda that describes Amin's tyrannical rule.

Personal life 
Kyemba was likely born sometime between 1937-1939 to Suzana Babirizangawo Mutekanga and Suleiman Kisajja, a colonial administrator in the Bunya County in Busoga. It's unclear what his exact year of birth is.

Education 
He attended local primary schools, before joining Busoga College Mwiri for his Cambridge School Certificate (1951-1956). He was at Makerere University between 1957 and 1962 and graduated with a Bachelor of Arts (Hons) History.
Kyemba holds a Masters' degree in History from Northwestern University, Evanston, US and a Certificate in African studies from the same University. He also holds an Honours degree in History from the London University.

Career 
Kyemba joined the Uganda civil service on the eve of Uganda's independence from Britain in 1962. He was the Principal Private Secretary to then Prime Minister of Uganda, Milton Obote. Following the 1971 Ugandan coup d'etat, he joined Amin's cabinet, rising through the ranks to become the Minister of Health (1974–1977) during Amin's regime.  Kyemba defected to London in 1977, where he wrote a book on Amin's regime titled: "A State of Blood." He returned to Uganda in 1986, and he currently serves as Secretary of Judicial Service Commission.

Writings

References

1939 births
Living people
Ugandan non-fiction writers
Place of birth missing (living people)
Health ministers of Uganda